Karwoudou Cole (born April 30), better known by his stage name Bucky Raw, is a Liberian rapper and songwriter from Monrovia. He rose to fame after appearing in a cypher at the 2016 Liberian Entertainment Awards. Raw has released two mixtapes: 2017's Country Soda and 2018's Cs2.

Music career
Raw was born on April 30, 1984, in Monrovia, Liberia. He moved to the United States when he was 9 years old. Raw grew up in a public housing unit in Southwest Philadelphia. He attended Pepper Middle School and John Bartram High School. Raw released his debut mixtape Country Soda in 2017. It features guest appearances from King Sammy, Drape Lawson, Mz Menneh and Monica Ree. His second mixtape CS2 was released in August 2018. It comprises 12 tracks and features guest appearances from Takun J, Jay Awesome, Tieah Boy and Rickslyn. It peaked at number 10 on the Billboard World Albums chart. Cs2 has been criticized for having derogatory lyrics. On November 16, 2019, Raw won Artist of the Year and the Video of the Year for "Thank You" at the Liberian Music Awards.

Deportation from the U.S 
In April 2018, Raw was arrested and deported to Liberia for violating the terms of his parole.

Discography

Mixtapes
Country Soda (2017)
CS2 (2018)

Singles

"Amen"
"Mammie Peppeh"
"Pro Poor Agenda"
"Wine Your Waist"
"Scrapper Heaven"
"Which One Heting You"
"Last Kiss"
"Friskayness"
"Woo Mii"
"Imported"
"Trapco Issues"
"Pump Tire"
"Put Talk"
"Jeh Leh Y'all"
"Jeh Bring It"
"Space on You"
"Luv"
"Wifey"
"Thank You"
"Abena"

Award and nominations

Tunes Liberia Music Awards

Liberia Music Awards

Liberian Entertainment Awards

See also
List of Liberian musicians

References

External links
 

Living people
Liberian songwriters
Musicians from Monrovia
Liberian singers
1984 births